George W. Thompson (April 3, 1888 – August 21, 1912) was a self-taught aviator, and is one of the first Coloradan flyers. He was born near Sharon Springs, Kansas. Thompson built a Mathewson biplane, a Curtiss design, and soloed it on January 4, 1911.

Biography 
His early career was working for the Mathewson Auto Company, Denver, Colorado. The company name later became the Mathewson Aeroplane Company. Thompson made several flights on his first flying day, and in the first year, about 100 flights during 1911. He was known to travel with his aircraft throughout Colorado and also in Wyoming, especially at county fairs with aerial shows. Thompson made the first flight ever in Wyoming using a Mathewson plane for the Independence Day celebration in Gillette, Wyoming in 1911.

In his short life, he built and flew nine "headless biplanes". He also helped to organize the American Federation of Aviators, and served as president in 1911-1912.

Thompson's primary flights took place at the Sable airstrip, a primitive airfield and auto racing track, located between the Fitzsimons Hospital and the Rocky Mountain Arsenal, the area of the old Stapleton Airport. For some of his Colorado travels, he disassembled his aircraft and shipped it in a boxcar to his destination.

George Thompson made a number of early contributions to Colorado aviation, but his life was cut short at the age of 24 by a crash at the Prowers County Fair at Lamar, Colorado on August 21, 1912. The Denver Post stated he lost control of his Mathewson biplane at an altitude of 200 feet after he "struck an air pocket" and hit the tree on the way down.

His headstone at Olinger Crown Hill Cemetery in Wheat Ridge, Colorado are engraved with the words "George W. Thompson, Colorado's First Aviator".

Colorado Hall of Fame
Thompson was inducted into the Colorado Aviation Hall of Fame in its first ceremony of 1969.

See also 
 Original ten 1969 Colorado Aviation Hall of Fame Laureates
 Ivy Baldwin
 Allan F. Bonnalie
 Ira Boyd "Bumps" Humphreys
 Albert E. Humphreys
 Will D. "Billy" Parker
 Chriss J. Peterson
 Reginald Sinclaire
 George W. Thompson
 Frank A. Van Dersarl
 Jerry Cox Vasconcells
 List of current Hall of Fame Laureates

References

Further reading
 Holmes, Charles W., Editor, Honoree Album of the Colorado Aviation Hall of Fame, The Colorado Aviation Historical Society, 1999, Audubon Media Corp., Audubon, IA.

External links
 EarlyAviators.org: George Thompson
 Colorado Aviation Historical Society website

1888 births
1912 deaths
American aviators
Aviation pioneers
Aviators killed in aviation accidents or incidents in the United States
History of aviation
People from Wallace County, Kansas
Victims of aviation accidents or incidents in 1912